Bedford Free School is a mixed secondary free school located in Bedford, Bedfordshire, England. The school opened in September 2012, and educates pupils from Bedford, Kempston and the wider Borough of Bedford. The school's roll grew yearly until it reached its 500 capacity of 11- to 16-year-olds. The school is now oversubscribed. The school is located on Cauldwell Street, Bedford.

History
Campaigning for a free school in Bedford and Kempston began in July 2010. On 6 September 2010, Michael Gove (Secretary of State for Education) announced Bedford Free School as one of the first 16 free schools to be set up under the UK coalition government. The business case for Bedford Free School was signed off by the Department for Education in May 2011.

Founding Principal Mark Lehain was previously head of mathematics and assistant head at Wootton Upper School. He was involved in the campaign for the free school but still had to compete with others for the post. The school's initial governing body included a magistrate, a stockbroker and a chartered accountant.

Originally scheduled to open in September 2011, the lack of suitable premises meant that Bedford Free School had to wait another year to open. In August 2011, Cauldwell House was chosen as the site for the school. Bedford Free School was due to open in September 2012, however in June 2012, members of Bedford Borough Council’s planning committee voted to not grant planning permission to the new school. The refusal of planning permission centred on concerns that the new school would create an unacceptable increase in traffic in the immediate area, and also that pupils safety may be compromised when being dropped off and picked up outside the school.

The refusal of planning permission was called "spiteful" by Richard Fuller, the MP for Bedford. He suggested that the decision was politically motivated by members of the council that were opposed the free schools programme. The school appealed the decision, and still opened in September 2012. Further to this, the school drew up contingency plans, should the appeal fail, and would have seen children at the school taught in a building at nearby Bedford College. In November 2012, the school won its appeal against the council's decision, after Eric Pickles (the Secretary of State for Communities and Local Government) decided in its favour.

In March 2013 it was reported that Bedford Free School had been established at a time when there would be a 25% surplus in secondary school places in Bedford.

In February 2014 the schools first Ofsted inspection was published and gave the school a rating of 'Requires improvement'. The report found that pupils at the school 'do not sustain good progress', and that the 'teaching does not expect enough of students'. Unusually the report also found that boys make better progress at the school than girls.

In February 2015 it was announced that the school has been awarded a grant to construct a new sports hall and activity studio. When complete the facilities will enable the school to offer some PE provision on-site. The school was granted planning permission for the works in November 2015, and the new facilities are expected to be completed by Summer 2016.

In March 2016 the schools second Ofsted inspection was published and gave the school a rating of 'Good' across all areas inspected.

In April 2017, the school announced that in partnership with Elstow School, it would form a new Multi-Academy Trust (MAT) named Advantage Schools.

In September 2017, Mark Lehain left the school to go and run campaign group Parents and Teachers for Excellence (PTE). The new Principal was Stuart Lock, previously Headteacher of Cottenham Village College. Stuart Lock also took up the role of Executive Principal of Advantage Schools. This latter role was one he took on full-time in the summer of 2019, when Tim Blake took up the role of Principal. Tim Blake is a founding father of Bedford Free School.

In January 2020 Bedford Free School was graded 'Outstanding' by Ofsted.

Academics
Bedford Free School teaches students between 8.25am and 4pm, with facilities available from 7.30am to 6.00pm. The school teaches core academic subjects such as maths, English, science, history, geography, French, Spanish, music, drama, art and Computer Science. In addition, literacy and numeracy are prioritised throughout the Key Stage 3 and Key Stage 4 curriculum.

References

External links
 Bedford Free School homepage

Secondary schools in the Borough of Bedford
Free schools in England
Educational institutions established in 2012
2012 establishments in England
Schools in Bedford